Point Pleasant may refer to:

Places 
In Canada
 Point Pleasant Park, Halifax, Nova Scotia

In England
 Point Pleasant (Wallsend), Tyne and Wear

In the United States
 Point Pleasant Township, Warren County, Illinois
 Point Pleasant, Indiana
 Point Pleasant, New Jersey
 Point Pleasant Beach, New Jersey
 Point Pleasant, Maryland, a neighborhood of Glen Burnie, Maryland
 Point Pleasant, Missouri, in New Madrid County, Missouri
 Point Pleasant, Ohio
 Point Pleasant, Pennsylvania
 Point Pleasant, West Virginia

Other 
 Point Pleasant (TV series), a 2005 Fox television show set in a fictionalized version of the New Jersey town
 Point Pleasant Battleground, near Point Pleasant, West Virginia, and site of a 1774 battle between Virginia militia and Native Americans
 "Point Pleasant", a song by God Is an Astronaut from the 2002 album The End of the Beginning

See also 
Point Pleasant Historic District (disambiguation)
 Pleasant Point (disambiguation)
 Point Pleasant High School (disambiguation)